"Sally in Our Alley" is a traditional English song, originally written by Henry Carey in 1725. It became a standard of British popular  music over the following century. The expression also entered popular usage, giving its name to a 1902 Broadway musical and several films including Sally in Our Alley, the 1931 screen debut of Gracie Fields.

Lyrics 
The song has 7 verses. The first of which is 

Of all the girls that are so smart

  There 's none like pretty Sally;

She is the darling of my heart, 

  And she lives in our alley.

There is no lady in the land         

  Is half so sweet as Sally; 

She is the darling of my heart,

  And she lives in our alley.

References

Bibliography
 Helen Kendrick Johnson. Our Familiar Songs and Those who Made Them: Three Hundred Standard Songs of the English-speaking Race, Arranged with Piano Accompaniment, and Preceded by Sketches of the Writers and Histories of Their Songs, Volume 1. H. Holt, 1881.

External links 

 Sally in Our Alley ·performed by  Benjamin Britten (piano) and Peter Pears (tenor) in 1964,  Youtube  https://www.youtube.com/watch?v=GnBRlJP-GfY

British songs
1725 songs